3 Feet High and Rising is the debut studio album by the American hip hop group De La Soul, released on March 3, 1989 by Tommy Boy Records. It was the first of three collaborations with the producer Prince Paul, and was the critical and commercial peak of both parties. The album title comes from the Johnny Cash song "Five Feet High and Rising". The album contains the singles "Me Myself and I", "The Magic Number", "Buddy", and "Eye Know".

The album was a critical and commercial success. It is consistently placed on lists of the greatest albums of all time by noted critics and publications, with Robert Christgau calling it "unlike any rap album you or anybody else has ever heard". In 1998, it was selected as one of The Sources "100 Best Rap Albums". It was selected by the Library of Congress as a 2010 addition to the National Recording Registry, which selects recordings annually that are culturally, historically, or aesthetically significant. As of 2023, it is the only De La Soul album to be certified platinum by the RIAA.

Along with the rest of De La Soul's back catalog, 3 Feet High and Rising was not made available for digital purchase or streaming until 2023, due to concerns about the legality of the samples for digital releases.

Musical style
Released amid the late-1980s boom in gangsta rap, which gravitated towards hardcore, confrontational, violent lyrics, 3 Feet High and Rising stood out from this trend by showcasing De La Soul's more positive style. The mirth and intelligence of De La Soul's self-presentation led many observers to label them a "hippie" group; however, this characterization was disputed by De La Soul themselves. On the album, De La Soul sought to explicitly distance themselves from gangsta rap by "lampoon[ing] emerging tropes" such as the growing materialism within the genre. Their lyrics are instead characterized by a variety of "bizarre and surreal" choices of subject matter, such as dandruff, gardening metaphors, and "Dr. Dolittle-esque interactions with animals".

3 Feet High and Rising uses a sample-heavy production style; in addition to sampling from funk and soul tracks, as was popular in the hip-hop of the era, the album also draws from sources such as doo-wop, psychedelic rock, and children's music. It has been described as "the first psychedelic hip-hop record". The album has also been noted for its use of unconventional song structures.

Artwork
The album's artwork was designed by Toby Mott's and Paul Spencer's radical British art collective the Grey Organisation (GO). In 1986 Mott and Spencer had moved from London to New York after GO's infamous paint attacks on Cork Street art galleries, where they began working as bicycle messengers. By 1989, GO were exhibiting their paintings around the East Village and working as art directors for Tommy Boy Records and MTV (among others) making music videos for various groups, such as Public Enemy, A Tribe Called Quest, and The Rolling Stones. GO also began designing album covers for groups such as Information Society and De La Soul, most notably 3 Feet High and Rising.

The album features a recurring lyrical motif of the "D.A.I.S.Y. Age", an acronym that stands either for either "Da Inner Sound, Y'all" or "Da Inner Soul, Y'all". This concept also inspired the design of the album cover, as Mott describes in his essay "Hip Hop in The Daisy Age":

Reception and influence

3 Feet High and Rising received widespread critical acclaim upon its release. "An inevitable development in the class history of rap, [De La Soul is] new wave to Public Enemy's punk", wrote Robert Christgau of the album in his 1989 "Consumer Guide" column for The Village Voice. "Their music is maddeningly disjunct, and a few of the 24-cuts-in-67-minutes (too long for vinyl) are self-indulgent, arch. But their music is also radically unlike any rap you or anybody else has ever heard — inspirations include the Jarmels and a learn-it-yourself French record. And for all their kiddie consciousness, junk-culture arcana, and suburban in-jokes, they're in the new tradition — you can dance to them, which counts for plenty when disjunction is your problem." Rolling Stone magazine's Michael Azerrad called 3 Feet High and Rising "(o)ne of the most original rap records ever to come down the pike", and described it as an "inventive, playful" record which "stands staid rap conventions on their def ear." When The Village Voice held its annual Pazz & Jop critics' poll for 1989, 3 Feet High and Rising was ranked at number one, outdistancing its nearest opponent (Neil Young's Freedom) by 21 votes and 260 points.

Sampling artists as diverse as Johnny Cash, Hall & Oates, Steely Dan and the Turtles, 3 Feet High and Rising is often viewed as the stylistic beginning of 1990s alternative hip hop (and especially jazz rap). Writing in retrospect for The A.V. Club, Nathan Rabin credits Prince Paul for helping "create progressive hip hop" with his production on 3 Feet High and Rising, while author John Riordan says "its comedy skits and positive lyrics established the group as a progressive hip-hop act at odds with the increasingly violent image of mainstream rap." Phil Witmer of Noisey cites De La Soul's "sampledelia" on the album as an "old-school" example of sampling being applied to "jarring, collage-like effect". 3 Feet High and Rising is also credited with introducing the hip hop skit, a style of comedic sketch used both to introduce rap albums and as interludes between songs.

On the Billboard charts, 3 Feet High and Rising peaked at No. 1 on the R&B/Hip Hop charts and No. 24 in the Top 200.

Retrospective opinion
3 Feet High and Rising has been included on numerous "best-of" lists. In 1998, the album was included in The Sources "100 Best Albums" list. It was ranked number 346 on Rolling Stones 2003 list of the "500 Greatest Albums of All Time", maintaining the ranking in a 2012 revision of the list, then rising to number 103 in a 2020 revision. 3 Feet High and Rising was voted number 138 in the 2000 edition of Colin Larkin's All Time Top 1000 Albums, while in 2005, it ranked 88th in a survey held by British television's Channel 4 to determine the 100 greatest albums of all time. The album was also included in the book 1001 Albums You Must Hear Before You Die.

In 2006, Q magazine placed the album at No. 20 in its list of "40 Best Albums of the '80s". In 2012, Slant Magazine listed the album at No. 9 on its list of "Best Albums of the 1980s". Spex listed 3 Feet High and Rising at No. 5 on its list of the Top 100 Albums of the Century. The album has also been ranked as among the top albums of 1989 by publications including Rolling Stone, The Face, Record Mirror, Sounds, OOR, and Melody Maker.

An NPR retrospective, published in 2023, stated that 3 Feet High and Rising "reshaped the public imagination of what hip-hop could be", and that it "still sounds wondrous and weird" in the musical landscape of the 2020s.

Electronica artist James Lavelle cited 3 Feet High and Rising as one of his favorite albums. "It was definitely a reaction to the slightly more hardcore area of what was going on in hip hop. As a concept record, it's probably one of the best ever. It's like the Pink Floyd of hip hop, their Dark Side of the Moon – the way it musically and sonically moves around, but also the use of language was so unusual and out there."

Macy Gray felt it was "the best record of the past 15 years" in a Q magazine, describing De La Soul as "like the Beatles of hip hop." The Village Voice, meanwhile, described 3 Feet High and Rising as "the Sgt. Pepper of hip hop".

In 2011, 3 Feet High and Rising was among 25 albums chosen as additions to the Library of Congress' 2010 National Recording Registry for being cultural and aesthetical and also for its historical impact.

"America's recorded-sound heritage has in many ways transformed the soundscape of the modern world, resonating and flowing through our cultural memory, audio recordings have documented our lives and allowed us to share artistic expressions and entertainment. Songs, words, and the natural sounds of the world that we live in have been captured on one of the most perishable of all of our art media. The salient question is not whether we should preserve these artifacts, but how best collectively to save this indispensable part of our history."— James H. Billington from the Library of Congress.

The track "The Magic Number" was used in the end credits of the 2021 film Spider-Man: No Way Home as a reference to the three iterations of Peter Parker that appear in the film.

Digital release 
3 Feet High and Rising, along with the rest of De La Soul's catalogue, was not made available for digital purchase or streaming until 3 March 2023, due to concerns about the legality of the samples for digital releases. Tommy Boy enlisted the music licensing company DMG Clearances to secure clearance for the samples, but talks failed with many of the copyright holders, as they were reticent to become involved with ongoing conflicts between De La Soul and Tommy Boy. After Tommy Boy sold De La Soul's catalog to Reservoir Media, DMG Clearances restarted talks in January 2022 and negotiated licenses for most of the samples. De La Soul interpolated or replayed samples that could not be cleared.

Track listing

Track listing notes:
 On the original issues, "Plug Tunin' (Original 12" version)" is exclusive to CD releases; UK releases move "Potholes In My Lawn" to the final track.
 Some copies of the bonus disc reissue contain "The Magic Number (Chad Jackson Hip Hop Version)" as track 15 on disc two.
 Otis Redding is only credited as a featured artist on "Eye Know" on 2023 digital releases.
 Songwriting credits sourced from 2023 digital release; original release only officially credited sampled artists as songwriters for "Change in Speak" (Patterson & Scipio), "Eye Know" (Becker & Fagen), "Say No Go" (Hall, Oates, & Allen), and "Me Myself & I" (Clinton & Wynne)
 All tracks are produced by Prince Paul and De La Soul, except "Jenifa Taught Me (Derwin's Revenge)", produced by Prince Paul, De La Soul, & Michael Fossenkemper, and "Description", produced by Prince Paul, De La Soul, and Q-Tip.

Personnel
Information taken from AllMusic.
De La Soul – arrangers, production assistance
Prince Paul – arranger, mixing, production
Trugoy the Dove – arranger
Al Watts – mixing, production, engineer, game show host
Sue Fisher – engineer
Bob Coulter – engineer
Greg Arnold – assistant engineer
Steven Miglio – layout design
Jungle Brothers – performer
Q-Tip – performer

Charts

Weekly charts

Year-end charts

Certifications

See also
List of Billboard number-one R&B albums of 1989

References

External links
 3 Feet High and Rising Accolades at acclaimedmusic.net
 1989 Video Presskit for 3 Feet High and Rising
 Audio segments about the album on WNYC

1989 debut albums
De La Soul albums
Albums produced by Prince Paul (producer)
Tommy Boy Records albums
United States National Recording Registry recordings
United States National Recording Registry albums